The third and final season of the American science fiction television series Star Trek, premiered on NBC on Friday, September 20, 1968 and concluded on Tuesday, June 3, 1969. It consisted of twenty-four episodes. Star Trek: The Original Series is an American science fiction television series produced by Fred Freiberger, and created by Gene Roddenberry, and the original series of the Star Trek franchise. It features William Shatner as Captain James T. Kirk, Leonard Nimoy as Spock and DeForest Kelley as Leonard McCoy.

Broadcast history
This is the first season to air after NBC moved the show from 8:30 P.M. to 10 P.M. on Friday nights. The season originally aired Fridays at 10:00-11:00 pm (EST) on NBC. The final episode aired on Tuesday, June 3, 1969, at 7:30-8:30 pm (EST).

Cast

Main

 William Shatner as Captain James T. Kirk: The commanding officer of the USS Enterprise
 Leonard Nimoy as Commander Spock: The ship's half-human/half-Vulcan science officer and first/executive officer 
 DeForest Kelley as Lieutenant Commander Dr. Leonard "Bones" McCoy: The ship's chief medical officer
 James Doohan as Lieutenant Commander Montgomery "Scotty" Scott: The Enterprises chief engineer and second officer
 Nichelle Nichols as Lieutenant Uhura: The ship's communications officer
 George Takei as Lieutenant Sulu: The ship's helmsman
 Walter Koenig as Ensign Pavel Chekov: A Russian-born navigator introduced in the second season premiere episode
 Majel Barrett as Nurse Christine Chapel: The ship's head nurse. Barrett also played the ship's first officer (number one) in "The Cage" and voiced the ship's computer.

Recurring
 Eddie Paskey as Lt. Leslie

Episodes

Home media
The season was released on DVD and Blu-ray by Paramount Home Entertainment.

The third season was released in original and also in a remastered format by 2008.

See also
 List of Star Trek: The Original Series episodes – all episodes listed in chronological order, no summaries
 Star Trek: The Original Series (season 1) – listing of first-season episodes, summarized with links
 Star Trek: The Original Series (season 2) – listing of second-season episodes, summarized with links

References

Star Trek: The Original Series
1968 American television seasons
Original Series
1969 American television seasons